Darkover, subtitled "The Ages of Chaos", is a board game published by Eon Products in 1979 that is  based on the Darkover novels by Marion Zimmer Bradley.

Description
Darkover is a game for 2–4 players in which players attempt to seize and hold the Elhalyn Tower, using their armies and psychic gifts. Reviewers noted that although this is ostensibly a board wargame, it contains many elements of a party game.

Components
The game box includes:
 8-page rulebook
 10" x 18" board divided into a number of regions with towers and castles.
 four 3-piece matrix screens
 four sets of 15 clan tokens numbered 1 to 10 (odd numbers are duplicated)
 24 Power discs (eight each of three designs)
 36 Peril chips
 One Monitor
 One Crown

Setup
All players write a dare; these are placed in a cup. Tokens are randomly placed on the board. One player is selected as Monitor, and one is the Crown holder.

Gameplay
Each turn starts with collection of power. Each player fills their Power disc allotment to three, then draws their choice of two peril chips or two clan tokens. Players may receive extra tokens if they own the Crown or castles. Players conquer regions and gain control of towers with special powers by using their clan tokens and other powers. Combat is resolved by Rock paper scissors. If both players choose "Rock", then they enter a chanting duel. Both players must chant something for 30 seconds; the first player to show emotion or look away is the loser.

The Monitor can punish a player who displays negative emotions by removing one of the player's clan tokens. The punished player then becomes the new Monitor.

Victory conditions
A player wins by taking control of the central Elhalyn Tower with four clan tokens for an entire turn.

Publication history
In 1958, Marion Zimmer Bradley wrote The Planet Savers, the first novel in a series of books about the world of Darkover that would eventually number more than 30 by the time of Bradley's death. The board game Darkover was a licensed creation designed by Bill Eberle, Jack Kittredge, and Peter Olotka, and was published in 1979 by the company the trio founded, Eon Products.

Reception
John Olsen reviewed Darkover for White Dwarf #18, giving it an overall rating of 9 out of 10, and stated that "Darkover is an excellent game and I recommend it whole-heartedly to everyone. I look forward to any future release from Eon Products".

In issue #34 of The Space Gamer, Bob Von Gruenigen found the game light but enjoyable: "Darkover is a good party game, better with four players than two. Its physical quality is impressive. If you enjoyed the Darkover novels, or if you enjoy unusual games, Darkover will be a worthwhile investment".

Games included Darkover in their "Top 100 Games of 1982", calling it a "bizarre game" but noting that it "requires strategic insight, self-control (players displaying anger, greed, or despair are penalized), and a distinct lack of inhibitions".

References

External links
 Darkover board game entry at BoardGameGeek

Board games introduced in 1979
Darkover